California Breeders' Champion Stakes is an American Thoroughbred horse race held annually since 1935 at Santa Anita Park in Arcadia, California.  In 2011 it will be in its 72nd running.

Run during the last week of December, the seven Furlong race is open to two-year-old horses bred in the State of California. The race currently offers a purse of $125,000.

In winning the 2007 edition, Bob Black Jack set a new Santa Anita track record of 1:20.37 for seven furlongs on synthetic dirt.  In the 2009 running, the race was set at one and one/sixteenth miles.

Winners of the California Breeders' Champion Stakes

Earlier winners 
1999 – Gibson County
1998 – General Challenge
1997 – Oly Ogy
1996 – In Excessive Bull
1995 – Ready To Order
1995 – Snow Kidd'n
1994 – Individual Style
1993 – El Atroz
1992 – Irish Twist
1991 – Apollo
1990 – Tarascon
1989 – Past Ages
1988 – No Commitment
1987 – Fast Delivery
1986 – Snow Chief
1985 – The Rogers Four
1984 – Fali Time
1983 – Northrexford Drive
1982 – Prince Spellbound
1981 – No race held
1980 – Johnlee n' Harold
1979 – Jaklin Klugman

1978 – Flying Paster
1977 – Misrepresentation
1976 – Current Concept
1975 – Stained Glass
1974 – Mr Paul
1973 – Money Lender
1972 – Ancient Title
1971 – Royal Owl
1970 – Bold Joey
1969 – No race held
1968 – Mr Joe F
1967 – Don B
1966 – Mira Femme
1965 – Separate Checks (1st div)
1965 – Wingover (2nd div)
1964 – Gummo
1963 – Hill Rise (1st division)
1963 – Nearco Blue (2nd division)
1962 – Kingomine
1961 – Najin
1961 – Olden Times
1960 – New Policy

1959 – Linmold
1958 – Old Pueblo
1957 – Prince Khaled
1956 – Fathers Risk
1955 – Guerrero
1954 – Major Speed
1952 – De Anza
1951 – Big Noise
1950 – Gold Capitol
1949 – Your Host
1948 – Duplicator
1947 – Call Bell
1946 – Shim Malone
1945 – Honeymoon
1941–1944 – No race held
1940 – Yankee Dandy
1939 – Red Chip
1938 – Dear Diary
1937 – Iron Hills
1936 – Some Devil
1935 – Lloyd Pan

Horse races in California
Flat horse races for two-year-olds
Recurring sporting events established in 1935